A practice-based research network (PBRN) is a group of practices devoted principally to the care of patients and affiliated for the purpose of examining the health care processes that occur in practices. PBRNs are characterized by an organizational framework that transcends a single practice or study. They provide a "laboratory" for studying broad populations of patients and care providers in community-based settings.

History of primary care research
Before there were research institutes or networks of practices, individual practitioners studied their patients' problems with scientific rigor. Among these were five general practitioners who have been recognized for their seminal work during the past 125 years. They are James Mackenzie, Will Pickles, John Fry, F.J.A. Huygen and Curtis G. Hames. Each of these pioneers demonstrated that important new knowledge could be discovered by practicing family physicians. More recently, practicing primary care pediatricians such as Burtis Breese and William Carey contributed a body of knowledge on child health. These doctors all wondered about their patients' problems and they developed a means of gathering and recording data on their patients.

Each of these research pioneers provide inspiration for the development of practice-based, primary care research networks because each demonstrated that important new knowledge could be discovered by the practicing primary care physician. They each wondered about their patients, developed means of gathering and recording data, and found collaborators and support from their staff and local communities. Unfortunately, they practiced in an era that was over-committed to specialism. Research focused on molecular mechanisms of disease. The rush to specialization by the medical community and the linking of research to specialists resulted in decades of neglect of primary care and virtually no recognition of the need to investigate care in the primary care setting.
Instead, the common wisdom viewed primary care practices as relatively boring places that could be potential sites of application of the fruits of research done elsewhere in research laboratories, hospitals and institutes.

Among the early regional networks started in the 1970s were the Dartmouth CO-OP PBRN in New Hampshire, Family Medicine Information System in Colorado (FMIS) and the Cooperative Information Project. These regional networks learned from each other and succeeded in conducting studies focused on what was happening in primary care. They attracted funding from medical schools, national philanthropic foundations and federal programs such as Health for Underserved Rural Areas. As the 1970s closed, these early networks enjoyed sufficient success to stimulate debate about the next steps in the context of the microcomputer's development. Among them was a small group convened by Gene Farley in Denver in 1978 to consider establishing a national sentinel practice system. It was this idea that lead to the Ambulatory Sentinel Practice Network and provided in retrospect what appears to have been a nidus for the establishment of primary care PBRNs in the United States. In the 1980s, pediatric research networks - the Pediatric Practice Research Group (PPRG) in metropolitan Chicago and the national Pediatric Research in Office Settings (PROS) network of the American Academy of Pediatrics - emerged as well.

PBRNs are feasible and that represent a useful infrastructure for the scientific discovery of family practice and primary care. Experience to date points out the great advantages enjoyed by those with enduring, core financial support—such as the Dutch with their early national commitment to primary care and their willingness to invest in primary care research. It is also obvious that these networks require collaboration, cooperation and a spirit of sharing and trust.

These networks are now at once both a place and a concept. As a place, they are a laboratory for surveillance and research. As a concept, they express the still unmet need for practicing primary care clinicians to accept responsibility to improve frontline clinical care by understanding what is happening in their practices. Successes to date have been sufficient to incite the Institute of Medicine's 1994 committee studying the future of primary care to recommend support to stabilize and expand practice-based primary care research networks.

Currently active
 AAFP NRN – AAFP National Research Network Kansas
 AANPNR – American Academy of Nurse Practitioners Network for Research Texas
 ACCESSPBRN – ACCESSPBRN Illinois
 ACCP PBRN – American College of Clinical Pharmacy Practice-Based Research Network Kansas
 ACERN – Ambulatory Care Evaluation and Research Network New York
 ACORN – Virginia Ambulatory Care Outcomes Research Network Virginia
 ACPNet – ACPNet Pennsylvania
 APBRN – Alabama Practice Based Research Network Alabama
 A-PBRN - Ayurveda Practice Based Research Network United Kingdom
 APN-ARC – Advanced Practice Nurse-Ambulatory Research Consortium Ohio
 APPD LEARN – Association of Pediatric Program Directors Longitudinal Educational Assessment Research Network  Virginia
 ARCHNAP  St. Louis Ambulatory Care Research Consortium for Nurses in Advanced Practice Missouri
 AT-PBRN – Athletic Training Practice-Based Research Network Arizona
 ATSU SOMA PBRN – A.T. Still University School of Osteopathic Medicine in Arizona PBRN Arizona
 AppNET – The Appalachian Research Network Tennessee
 ArkPBRN – Arkansas Practice Based Research Network Arkansas
 BIGHORN – Building Investigative Practices for Better Health Outcomes Colorado
 BWPC PBRN – Brigham and Women's Primary Care Practice-Based Research Network Massachusetts
 BraveNet – The Bravewell Integrative Medicine Research Network North Carolina
 C-AHEAD PBRN – Center for the Advancement of Healthcare Education and Delivery PBRN Colorado
 CAARN - Community-Academic Aging Research Network (UW-Madison)
 CAPRICORN – Capital Area Primary Care Research Network District of Columbia
 CARinG Network – Cincinnati Area Research Group Network Ohio
 CCPC – Connecticut Center for Primary Care Connecticut
 CDN – Clinical Directors Network, Inc. New York
 COCONet – Colorado Child Outcomes Network Colorado
 CORC – CAMHS Outcomes Research Consortium UK
 CONCORD-PBRN – Consortium for Collaborative Osteopathic Research Development Practice-Based Research Network Texas
 CORNET – Continuity Research Network Virginia
 CPNet – Community Physician's Network Georgia
 CSPC – Centre for Studies in Primary Care 
 CSRN – CLEAR Scoliosis Research Network Texas
 CaReNet  – Colorado Research Network Colorado
 Cedars-Sinai PBRN-Cedars-Sinai Medical Delivery Network PBRN California
 CenTexNet – Central Texas Primary Care Research Network Texas
 DC PrimCare PBRN – District of Columbia Primary Care Practice-Based Research Network District of Columbia
 DO-Touch.NET – Doctors of Osteopathic Medicine Treating with OMM: Usefulness in Current Healthcare Missouri
 DesertNet – DesertNet Arizona Primary Care Research Network Arizona
 E-CARE – Eastern Carolina Association for Research & Education North Carolina
 EBD-PBRN – Evidence-Based Decisions in Dentistry Practice-Based Research Network California
 EPICnet – Eastern Pennsylvania Inquiry Collaborative Network Pennsylvania
 GR-PBRN – Greater Rochester Practice Research Network New York
 GRIN – Great Lakes Research Into Practice Network Michigan
 HCH PBRN – Health Care for the Homeless Practice Based Research Network Tennessee
 HHR – Holistic Healthcare and Research Centre 
 HPRN – High Plains Research Network Colorado
 HamesNet – HamesNet Georgia
 Healthy Communities – Physicians of Southwest Washington Foundation for Quality Improvement Washington
 ICPA PBRN – International Chiropractic Pediatric Association PBRN Pennsylvania
 IDND – Indianapolis Discovery Network for Dementia Indiana
 IFHRN – Institute for Family Health Research Network New York
 IRENE – Iowa Research Network Iowa
 ISRN-RN  – Improvement Science Research Network Texas
 JCCCR – Jefferson Coordinating Center for Clinical Research Pennsylvania
 JDPBRN  – Dental PBRN Japan 
 JHCP-PCRN – Johns Hopkins Community Physicians Primary Care Research Network Maryland
 JaxHERO – Jacksonville Health Equity Research Organization Florida
 KAN – Kentucky Ambulatory Network Kentucky
 LA Net – LA Net Community Health Network California
 LAC DHS ACN-R&I – Los Angeles County Department of Health Services, Ambulatory Care Network  – Research & Innovation California
 La MAISON – Louisiana Medical Home Ambulatory Improvements and Outcomes Network Louisiana
 Lutheran Network – Lutheran Family Health Center Network New York
 MAFPRN – Minnesota Academy of Family Physicians Research Network Minnesota
 MAPPR – Mecklenburg Area Partnership for Primary Care Research North Carolina
 MASNRN – Massachusetts School Nurse Research Network Massachusetts
 MCHS PBRN – Mayo Clinic Health System Practice Based Research Network Minnesota
 MGPC-PBRN – Massachusetts General Primary Care Practice Based Research Network Massachusetts
 MPCRN – Military Primary Care Research Network Maryland
 MPPBRN – Minnesota Pharmacy Practice-Based Research Network Minnesota
 MTN – MO Therapy Network Missouri
 MedEdNet – Medical Education Research Network Oregon
 Mercy – Sisters of Mercy Health System Network Missouri
 MetroNet  – Metropolitan Detroit Practice-based Research Network Michigan
 NC MARCH – North Carolina Multisite Adolescent Research Consortium for Health North Carolina
 NC-FM-RN – North Carolina Family Medicine Research Network North Carolina
 NCCHRN – North Carolina Child Health Research Network North Carolina
NCnet - Combined PBRNS founded at UNC-Chapel Hill contains NC-FM-RN, NCCHRN, NC MARCH and RCPCrN
 NECF PBRN – New England Clinicians Forum Practice-Based Research Network Connecticut
 NNE CO-OP PCBRN- Northern New England CO-OP Practice & Community Based Research Network (formerly known as the Dartmouth CO-OP PBRN)
 NEON – Northeastern Ohio Network Ohio
 NFPCRN  – North Florida Pediatric Community Research Network Florida
 NIPC-PBRN – National Interdisciplinary Primary Care PBRN Iowa
 NJPCRN  – New Jersey Primary Care Research Network New Jersey
 NP-PITTNet – NursePractitioner-PITTNet Pennsylvania
 NYC RING – New York City Research & Improvement Networking Group New York
 NYU-HHC CRA – New York University (NYU)-Health and Hospitals Corporation (HHC) Clinical Research Association (CRA) New York
 National Dental PBRN – The National Dental Practice-Based Research Network Alabama
 NetHaven at Yale – NetHaven Practice Based Research Network Connecticut
 NorTex – North Texas Primary Care Practice Based Research Network Texas
 NorthShore PBRN – NorthShore Practice-Based Improvement Research Network Illinois
 Northwest PRECEDENT – Northwest Practice-based REsearch Collaborative in Evidence-based DENTistry Washington
 OCHRN – Oklahoma Child Health Practice Based Research Network Oklahoma
 OKPRN – Oklahoma Physicians Resource/Research Network Oklahoma
 ORPRN  – Oregon Rural Practice-based Research Network  Oregon
 OPTI-WestNet – OPTI-West Practice-Based Research Network Colorado
 OQUIN – Outpatient Quality Improvement Network South Carolina
 OSU-PCPBRN – Ohio State University Primary Care Practice Based Research Network Ohio
 PAMFRI – Palo Alto Medical Foundation Research Institute California
 PBRN-VA – VA Mental Health Practice-Based Research Network Texas
 PCRC – Duke Primary Care Research Consortium North Carolina
 PDC PBRN – Pediatric Diagnostic Center PBRN California
 PPOC – The Pediatric Physicians' Organization at Children's Massachusetts
 PRN – Portland Research Network Oregon
 PROS – Pediatric Research in Office Settings Illinois
 PSARN – Penn State Ambulatory Research Network Pennsylvania
 PeRC – The Pediatric Research Consortium Pennsylvania
 Pediatric PittNet – Pediatric PittNet: University of Pittsburgh CTSI PBRN Pennsylvania
 RAP – Research Association of Practices of the PBRN Shared Resource Ohio
RCPCrN – Robeson County Primary Care research Network North Carolina
REACH Network – Research and Education for Academic Achievement Network Illinois
 RIOS NET –  Research Involving Outpatient Settings Network New Mexico
 Rx-SafeNet – Medication Safety Research Network of Indiana Indiana
 SAFTINet – Scalable Architecture for Federated Translational Inquiries Network Colorado
 SALT-Net – The Studying, Acting, Learning, and Teaching Network New York
 SAPPHIRE – South Asian Practice Partnership for Health Improvement and Research New York
 SCOR Network – Slone Center Office-based Research Network Massachusetts
 SCPPRN – South Carolina Pediatric Practice Research Network South Carolina
 SERCN – Southeast Regional Clinicians Network Georgia
 SF Bay CRN – San Francisco Bay Collaborative Research Network California
 SICTRN – Southeastern Integrated Clinical and Translational Research Network Florida
 SIPRO – Southern Illinois Practice Research Organization Illinois
 SOAR-Net – Southwestern Ohio Ambulatory Research Network Ohio
 SPUR-Net – Southern Primary-care Urban Research Network Texas
 SRN – ShowMe Research Network Missouri
 STARNet – South Texas Ambulatory Research Network Texas
 STOHN – South Texas Oral Health Network Texas
 STP PBRN – South Texas Psychiatric Practice-Based Research Network Texas
 SWIRLNet – South West Innovative Research and Learning Network Colorado
 Safety Net West – Safety Net West Oregon
 South Asian PBRN – South Asian PBRN 
 Southeast Wisconsin Alliance for Translating Research into Practice – Southeast Wisconsin Alliance for Translating Research into Practice Wisconsin
 TAMHSC-RCHI – Texas A&M Health Science Center Rural and Community Health Institute Texas
 UCLA PCRN – UCLA Primary Care Research Network California
 UMASS-FM-PBRN  – UMass Family Medicine PBRN Massachusetts
 UNYNET – Upstate New York Practice Based Research Network New York
 UT Pharm Net – University of Tennessee Pharmacist Practice Based Research Network Tennessee
 UUPCRN – Utah Health Research Network Utah
 VCMCDDCP – Ventura County Medical Center Diabetes Data Control Project Practice Based California
 WPRN – WWAMI region Practice and Research Network Washington
 WREN – Wisconsin Research and Education Network Wisconsin
 WU PAARC – Washington University Pediatric and Adolescent Ambulatory Research Consortium Missouri
 WesTRN  – West Texas Research Network Texas

References

External links
 North American Primary Care Research Group
Pediatric Research in Office Settings (PROS) 
Oklahoma Physician Research /Resource Network
 Practice Partner Research Network
 Agency for Healthcare Research and Quality  – PBRN Programs
 International Federation of Primary Care Research Networks
 National Research Network – American Academy of Family Physicians
 Integrative Ayurveda Network – Ayurveda-Practice Based Research Network, UK

Primary care